Asad Zaman (born 1955) is a Pakistani professor, economist, and social scientist. Previously he has served as Vice-Chancellor of the Pakistan Institute of Development Economics, Islamabad, member of the Economic Advisory Committee to the Prime Minister, and Director General of International Institute of Islamic Economics, International Islamic University, Islamabad. He earned his Ph.D. in economics from Stanford University in 1978, MS in statistics from Stanford University in 1976, and BS in mathematics from MIT in 1974. He is also the editor of International Econometric Review, and on the editorial board of many other journals. For more biographical material, see “Reflections on an MIT education”, “The Education of an Economist”, and https://asadzaman.net/about-me/.  

Books like “The Long Divergence: How Islamic Law Held Back the Middle East”, “Rulers, Religion, and Riches: Why the West Got Rich and the Middle East Did Not”, and many others, explore the reasons for the great divergence in growth rates of European Societies and the rest of the world. This question has been one of the central foci of Dr. Asad Zaman's research over the past few decades. He argues the global conquest and colonization by the West led to shock-and-awe, and an inferiority complex in the East. The conquest of the Mongols was easily overcome, but the loss to the West occurred on the intellectual battleground. This is the real source of the current difficulties of Islamic Civilization. The imposition of alien structures of knowledge, and foreign colonial institutions, unsuitable to Islamic societies, has prevented the development of indigenous analysis and institutional structures. He has proposed the “Ghazali Project”, described in greater detail later, as a solution to this problem.

Publications 
The Google Scholar author page for Asad Zaman lists more than 100 published articles, with more than 1800 citations. The top 3 highly cited papers are listed below:

Econometric applications of high-breakdown robust regression techniques This paper was of seminal importance in popularizing the use of robust techniques in econometrics.

Islamic economics: A survey of the literature This paper breaks from an orthodoxy that holds that Islamic Economics can be harmonized with Western economics. It argues strongly that the two approaches are diametrically opposed in many different ways. This theme is further clarified in a later paper on Islam Versus Economics.

Interindustry variation in the costs of job displacement This paper provides an exposition of the merits of empirical and Hierarchical Bayesian estimators in cross-section data sets.

Also, Statistical foundations for econometric techniques is a highly cited advanced econometrics text. The back-cover quotes Nobel Laureate Lawrence Klein: “Asad Zaman's ... provides highly informative insight for economists. He has taken econometrics back to its most fruitful origins ... ”  

Downloadable copies of over 80 publications by Dr. Asad Zaman are available from his author page at https://ssrn.com/author=289526. The top three downloads include “Islamic Economics: A Survey of the Literature”, already discussed earlier. The other two are:

Rise and Fall of a Market Economy This paper uses the analysis of Karl Polanyi’s Great Transformation to argue that market economies create market societies, with destructive social norms of greed and competition. The spread of market societies has led to multiple crises and looming planetary collapse. It is the need of the hour to replace the market mechanism with social mechanisms based on generosity, cooperation, and social responsibility.  

The Empirical Evidence Against Neoclassical Utility Theory: A Review of the Literature This paper surveys the massive amount of empirical evidence against neoclassical utility theory, which is the foundation of modern economics.

Radical Views 
At the heart of Dr. Asad Zaman’s radical views is the idea that “Social Science” makes a false claim to universality, while it is based upon European societies, and restricted to the West inapplicability. Arguments for this claim are detailed in the following two papers.

“The Puzzle of Western Social Science” Why does modern social science claim to be universal in application, when it is easily seen to be based on the European experience? The paper argues that Max Weber's insistence that social science should be value-free led to the concealments of values within an apparently objective, rational, and value-neutral framework.

“The Origins of Western Social Science” This paper argues that loss of faith in Christianity led to the re-opening of the major questions concerning the meaning of our lives, the origins of the universe, and standards of conduct. Western social science developed from the attempt to find answers to these fundamental questions, and hence can be regarded as the religion which replaced Christianity in Europe. The answers which it produced are radically opposed to the answers provided by traditional religions across the world, and hence not compatible with Christianity or Islam.

Surprisingly, Dr. Zaman also rejects Statistics and Econometrics as elements of the Western Social Sciences. In “Fisher's Failures and the Foundations of Statistics”, he argues that Fisher developed the current methodology to enable reduction of large amounts of data to a few sufficient statistics primarily because of lack of adequate computational capabilities. This methodology is now obsolete but remains in place due to intellectual inertia. Similarly, in “A Realist Approach to Econometrics”, he argues that Econometrics is nothing more than fraud by numbers. Regression results come out of the impossibly stringent assumptions of regression models but are falsely attributed to the data.

Rejecting Western Social Science as a Eurocentric religion leads to the obvious question of what should replace it? Dr. Asad Zaman sketches an outline for a discipline of Uloom-ul-Umran (the science of living together) based loosely on the methodology of Ibn-e-Khaldun, the founder of the social sciences. He has also developed alternate approaches to Statistics, Econometrics, and Economics, outlined in the COURSES section given below.

Islamic Economics 
Rejection of Western Social Science obviously leads to a call for rebuilding the entire domain of knowledge from the ground up. Dr. Zaman argues for replacing Western Economics with Islamic Economics. A few of his key papers in this area are:

“The Normative Foundations of Scarcity” illustrates the theme that Western Social Science is built upon hidden moral foundations. The apparently objective concept of scarcity is based on three moral principles, discussed in the paper.

“The Crisis in Islamic Economics” The paper argues that orthodox attempts to build Islamic economics in harmony with Western Economics have failed, leading to a crisis. This is because of the attempt to combine contradictory bodies of knowledge. Alternative foundations on which a genuine Islamic economic theory could be constructed involve recognizing the freedom of human beings to choose between good and evil. The goal of Islamic economics is to create a spiritual transformation in human beings and to use material means to bring this about.

“Islam's Gift: An Economy of Spiritual Development” This paper explains how an Islamic approach to economics would be concerned with the spiritual development of society, as opposed to the accumulation of wealth.

The Ghazali Project 
Dr. Zaman characterizes the current problem facing the Islamic Civilization as being similar to the one faced and resolved by Imam Al-Ghazali a millennium ago. Shock-and-awe of translations of the complex and sophisticated Greek philosophies led the Mu’tazila to conclude that reason (=Greek Philosophy) was on par with revelation (=Quran). In his landmark book “The Incoherence of the Philosophers”, Al-Ghazali demonstrated major flaws underlying these philosophies and created alternative approaches based on Islamic foundations. Dr. Zaman argues that today the Modern Mu’tazila have accepted the Western Social Sciences as being on par with, or superior to, a thousand years of developments within the Islamic intellectual tradition. To counter this, it is necessary to reject Western Social Science as being built upon moral foundations antithetical to Islam. For more details, see the Ghazali Project.

Courses 
A Western education automatically creates a Western worldview, which conflicts with Islamic teachings. The greatest challenge facing Muslims today is to develop an alternative to secular modern education. The puzzle of how an Islamic methodology can affect the teaching of apparently objective and secular subjects is addressed in “Useful Versus Useless Knowledge”.  Dr. Zaman has developed several online courses, freely available, to illustrate:

 Capitalist Economics (an Islamic Approach): This course treats economic theory within its historical and cultural context. The course covers Karl Polanyi's The Great Transformation, and relevant theoretical materials.
 Descriptive Statistics: An Islamic Approach: This basic course on descriptive statistics explains that numbers cannot be analyzed in isolation from their real-world meanings and application context. Once real-world context, and “useful knowledge” are taken into account, then Islamic concepts play an important role. See post on “Statistics: An Islamic Approach?” for further explanation.
 Fundamental Probability Concepts: An Islamic Approach. Focusing on what is useful, as opposed to theorem/proof/axiomatics, is like focusing on driving, instead of teaching how the car engine works. This set of six lectures teaches basic concepts of probability theory for one variable case at the level of Mood, Graybill, and Boes, using the bare essential mathematics required. 
 Econometrics for Muslims: Focusing on materials that matter for applications, and excluding many standard topics which have theoretical value but no application, creates an unusual approach to econometrics.

Social Media 
Dr. Asad Zaman blogs at the WEA Pedagogy Blog and the Islamic Worldview Blog. He also has a YouTube Channel https://www.youtube.com/c/AsadZaman7

References

External links
 Personal website
 www.era.org.tr/articles.html
 

Pakistani scientists
1953 births
Living people
Date of birth missing (living people)
Stanford University alumni